Sonho Meu is a Brazilian telenovela produced and broadcast by TV Globo. It ran from September 27, 1993, to May 14, 1994. It was written by Marcílio Moraes and directed by Reynaldo Boury, with co-direction by Roberto Naar. The action takes place in the city of Curitiba. It was also broadcast in Portugal.

Opening
The opening credits are shown with the protagonist Carolina Pavanelli making drawings that move and float around her while the opening song "Sonho Meu", sung by Xuxa and José Augusto, plays.

Location
Sonho Meu was notably one of the few Rede Globo telenovelas not to be set in Rio de Janeiro or São Paulo. Instead, it was set in Curitiba, making use of the city's landmarks as shooting locations.

Ratings
Sonho Meu was one of the most successful Brazilian telenovelas of the 90s, having been the last telenovela of the 6:00 p.m. time slot to have an overall average higher than 40 points, reaching an average of 44 points and in some episodes as high as 60.

Cast

 Patrícia França - Cláudia 
 Leonardo Vieira - Lucas
 Carolina Pavanelli - Maria Carolina 'Laleska'
 Fábio Assunção - Jorge
 Isabela Garcia - Lúcia 
 Elias Gleizer - Tio Zé 
 Beatriz Segall - Paula Candeias de Sá
 Walmor Chagas - Afrânio Guerra
 Yoná Magalhães - Magnólia
 Débora Duarte - Mariana 
 Nívea Maria - Elisa 
 Míriam Pires - Cecília
 Flávio Galvão - João Fontana 
 José de Abreu - Geraldo 
 Françoise Forton - Gilda 
 Mauro Mendonça - Carlos 
 Jayme Periard - William
 Jorge Cherques - Bóris 
 Eri Johnson - Giácomo Madureira 
 Carlos Kroeber - Varela 
 Priscila Camargo - Polaca 
 Cristina Mullins - Márcia 
 Cláudia Magno - Josefina 
 Alexandre Lippiani - Luís Ortega 
 Ângelo Paes Leme - Santiago
 Bernadete Lys - Júlia 
 Beta Madruga - Taboinha 
 Carlos Alberto - Fiapo 
 Carmem Caroline - Ximena 
 Cláudia Sheer - Aída
 Daniela Camargo - Francisca 
 Eduardo Caldas - Chico (credited as Eduardo Albuquerque)
 Fabiano Miranda - Trigo 
 Flávia Alessandra - Inez 
 Gisela Reimann - Alice
 Haydée Miranda
Mariana Da Silva
 Hélio Ribeiro - Juarez
 José Augusto Branco
 Karine Melo - Marília 
 Lina Fróes - Rosa 
 Luíza Curvo - Aninha 
 Maria Thompson - Clara
 Mariane Ebert
 Mauro Gorini - Feriado 
 Monique Lafond
 Naura Schneider - Helena
 Nedira Campos - Angela 
 Newton Martins - Mercadoria 
 Renata de Castro Barbosa - Carla 
 Renato Pinheiro - Cacá
 Ruthinéa de Moraes - Alcinéia 
 Sérgio Mannarino - Carlos Alberto 
 Tânia Loureiro - Miriam

External links 
 

Brazilian telenovelas
TV Globo telenovelas
1993 telenovelas
1993 Brazilian television series debuts
1994 Brazilian television series endings
Children's telenovelas
Portuguese-language telenovelas